Jesse Weißenfels (born 26 May 1992) is a German footballer who plays as a centre-forward for VfB Homberg.

References

External links
 

1992 births
People from Wesel
Sportspeople from Düsseldorf (region)
Footballers from North Rhine-Westphalia
Living people
German footballers
Association football forwards
Borussia Mönchengladbach II players
FC Schalke 04 II players
Sportfreunde Lotte players
SC Preußen Münster players
SV Waldhof Mannheim players
SSVg Velbert players
VfB Homberg players
3. Liga players
Regionalliga players
Oberliga (football) players